Muk Min Ha is a village in Tsuen Wan District, Hong Kong.

Administration
Muk Min Ha is a recognized village under the New Territories Small House Policy.

See also
 Chuen Lung
 Kap Lung

References

External links
 Delineation of area of existing village Muk Min Ha (Tsuen Wan) for election of resident representative (2019 to 2022)

Villages in Tsuen Wan District, Hong Kong